Arninge Church is a Late Romanesque church in the little village of Arninge, some  south of Nakskov on the Danish island of Lolland. Built of red brick in the 13th century, it has an intricately carved auricular altarpiece created by Henrik Werner in 1644.

History
The church was originally dedicated to the Virgin Mary.

Architecture
Built of red brick, the church consists of a Romanesque apse, chancel and nave and a Gothic porch. There is a free-standing 14th century timber bell tower adjacent to the church. The chancel has traces of a round-arched south door and of a round-arched window, now bricked up. There are also traces of two Romanesque windows in the south wall of the nave above the porch. The three cross-vaults in the nave are from the Late-Romanesque period.

Interior
The altarpiece (1644) was carved in the auricular style by Henrik Werner who also created the altarpiece in Maribo Cathedral. Werner's workshop also produced the carved font (c. 1640). The crucifix on the chancel wall was found on the loft during restoration work in 1937. The figure of Christ is from c. 1300 although the cross itself is more recent. The Renaissance pulpit is from c. 1605.

See also
List of churches on Lolland

References

 

Lolland
Churches in Lolland
Romanesque architecture in Denmark
Lutheran churches converted from Roman Catholicism
Churches in the Diocese of Lolland–Falster